Jabariya Jodi is an  Indian Hindi-language romantic comedy film starring Sidharth Malhotra and Parineeti Chopra. The story is based upon the tradition of groom kidnapping, prevalent in Bihar. The film is produced by Ekta Kapoor, Shobha Kapoor and Shailesh R Singh, and directed by Prashant Singh. Principal photography began on 10 August 2018 in Lucknow, and the film was theatrically released in India on 9 August 2019.

Cast
 Sidharth Malhotra as Abhay Singh 
 Parineeti Chopra as  Babli Yadav (Few lines as Mona Ghosh Shetty)  
 Javed Jaffrey as Hukum  Singh 
 Sanjay Mishra as Duniya Lal Yadav
 Aparshakti Khurana as Santosh Pathak 
 Elli Avram as Zilla
 Ruslaan Mumtaz as Kush
 Chandan Roy Sanyal as Guddu
 Neeraj Sood as Pathak ji 
 Arfi Lamba as Jeetu
 Yogita Rathore as Abhay's sister
 Sheeba Chadda as Abhay's mother
 Mohit Baghel Replaced Mohit Daga as Halla
 Gopal Datt as Inspector Tiwari
 Aaryan Arora as Young Abhay
 Anupam Mishra as Photographer
 Sharad Kapoor as Daddan Yadav
 Alankrita Sahai as an item number song "Macchardani"

Production

Development
The film was conceived by writer Sanjeev K Jha who is from Bihar and is familiar with forced marriage practice in his native state. He was surprised to see the official data that said that more abductions happened in Bihar for the purpose of forced marriage than ransom in recent years. He said in a statement, "We always knew such forced marriages happen, but we didn't know the magnitude of it." It was an eye-opener for him so he created a comic world and a love-story using this bizarre practices.

Filming 
Filming began on 10 August 2018 in Lucknow, Barabanki and Raebareli. The film wrapped shooting in mid April 2019.

Release
The release date of the film was initially scheduled to be 17 May 2019 but the date had to be pushed back multiple times first to 12 July 2019 and then to 2 August 2019 and finally it released theatrically on 9 August 2019.

Soundtrack 

The music of the film is composed by Tanishk Bagchi, Vishal Mishra, Sachet–Parampara, Ramji Gulati and Ashok Masti while lyrics are written by Raj Shekhar, Rashmi Virag, Shabbir Ahmed, Kumaar, Tanishk Bagchi and Siddharth-Garima. Background music scored by Joel Crasto.

Reception 

Nandini Ramnath from Scroll.in rated the movie 1.5 stars on 5 and wrote, "Inexplicably convoluted and unforgivably long".

Sandip Pal of DesiMartini rated the movie 2 stars on 5 and wrote, "Wonder What The Film Wanted To Convey With Its Hapzhazard Plotline" and taking about the lead actors he said, "When we talk about performances, Sidharth Malhotra for some strange reason looks comfortable in the skin of his character but falters when it comes to the body language and the Bihari diction. It sounds fake!" as of Parineeti Chopra he said, "Coming to Parineeti Chopra – she has been playing the [feisty] motor-mouth girl in almost all her films and this film too she plays a girl who is cheeky and audacious and is ready to go to any length to get what she wants! Well, this is just for the first half. In the second half, wonder what happens to her strength of character, she is forever crying and sulking like forever and ever! This sudden change in the characteristic after the interval is not just off-putting but it is also very obnoxious, much more than her red hair! Chopra needs to get her act together."

Koimoi rated the movie 3 on 5 stars and on their Watch or Not they wrote, "Only if you can filter out what's not important to your taste"

Latesly rated the movie 2.5 on 5 stars and wrote, "It is quite strange in a movie about groom-napping, that it is the 'Jabariya' of the title that provides some of the fun moments, and the 'Jodi' that lets the movie down. Jabariya Jodi is entertaining when it plays for the laughs, but goes horribly messed up when it amps up the romance. At best, a passable one-time watch, if you can keep your butts Jabariya on to the seats in the second half!" and of the performances they wrote, "Sidharth Malhotra and Parineeti Chopra do their best, but are let down by their muddled characterisation".
Lakshana N Palat from India Today reviewed, "Sidharth Malhotra and Parineeti Chopra film is excruciatingly painful" and rated the movie 1.5 out of 5 stars.

The Times of India's Ronak Kotecha rated the movie 2.5 stars on 5 and wrote, "Jabariya Jodi starts on a promising note, but loses steam along the way. It tries to throw light on serious issues with lighter moments, but gets tangled in a melodramatic and unrealistic narrative that doesn't feel all that jabardust."

Shubhra Gupta of The Indian Express rated the movie 1 on 5 stars calling it a confused long drawn mess.

Box office
Jabariya Jodi's opening day collection was 27.0 million and the second day collection was 37.0 million, whereas the third day collection went up to 45.0 million, making its total collection for opening weekend to 109.0 million.

, with a gross of 19.21 crore in India and 1.92 crore overseas, the film has a worldwide gross collection of 21.13 crore.

References

External links
 
 Jobariya Jodi on Bollywood Hungama
 

2010s Hindi-language films
Films scored by Sachet–Parampara
Films scored by Vishal Mishra
Films scored by Ramji Gulati
Films about Indian weddings
2019 romantic comedy films
Films set in Bihar
2019 masala films
Indian romantic comedy films